Bernardo Landriani or Bernardo Landriano (died 1451) was a Roman Catholic prelate who served as Bishop of Asti (1446–1451) and Bishop of Como (1439–1446).

Biography
On 31 August 1439, Bernardo Landriani was appointed during the papacy of Pope Eugene IV as Bishop of Asti.
On 18 March 1446, he was appointed during the papacy of Pope Eugene IV as Bishop of Como.
He served as Bishop of Como until his death in 1451.

References

External links and additional sources
 (for Chronology of Bishops) 
 (for Chronology of Bishops) 
 (for Chronology of Bishops) 
 (for Chronology of Bishops) 

15th-century Italian Roman Catholic bishops
Bishops appointed by Pope Eugene IV
1451 deaths